Maxime Ouattara (born 10 January 1995) is a Burkinabé international footballer who plays for Salitas, as a defender.

Career
He has played club football for AS SONABEL and Salitas.

He made his international debut for Burkina Faso in 2015.

References

1995 births
Living people
Burkinabé footballers
Burkina Faso international footballers
AS SONABEL players
Salitas FC players
Association football defenders
21st-century Burkinabé people
Burkina Faso A' international footballers
2018 African Nations Championship players